Narrabeenia is a genus of flies in the family Dolichopodidae found in Australia. It is named after Narrabeen, New South Wales.

Species
The genus contains two species:
Narrabeenia difficilis (Parent, 1933)
Narrabeenia spinipes Bickel, 1994

References 

Dolichopodidae genera
Sciapodinae
Diptera of Australasia